Mycterus concolor is a species of beetle in the family Mycteridae. It is found in North America.

References

Further reading

 
 

Tenebrionoidea
Articles created by Qbugbot
Beetles described in 1853